Chris Hart (born August 11, 1968) in Fort Benning, Georgia.

Hart was a representative in the House of Representatives of the U.S. state of Florida. He received his bachelor's degree from the Florida State University in 1991, and his Master of Business Administration from the University of South Florida in 1999. He currently lives in [Thomasville, Georgia], with his wife, Amy.  They own The Hare & The Hart, a Home decor, DIY paint, and gift shop.

External links
Official Bio for Representative Hart

1968 births
Living people
Republican Party members of the Florida House of Representatives
People from Tampa, Florida
Florida State University alumni
University of South Florida alumni